Bill Cash (born 1940) is a British Conservative politician and a prominent Eurosceptic in the House of Commons.

William  or Bill Cash may also refer to:
 William Cash (author and journalist) (born 1966), son of Bill Cash
 William Wilson Cash (1880–1955), Anglican bishop
 William Thomas Cash (1878–1951), American educator, author and politician
 Bill Cash (baseball) (1919–2011), baseball player in the Negro leagues
 William Cash (accountant) (1891–1964), English accountant and business director